Courtney Adeleye is a Nigerian-American entrepreneur and the CEO and founder of Mane Choice, a hair care products company. Her initial investment was $500 and the company, as of 2018, has $25 million in sales.

Background and career 
Adeleye was raised in Detroit, Michigan. While she was studying nursing at the University of Michigan, she started to experiment with hair care products for herself. She started a YouTube channel that soon grew to have 100,000 members. Her products are now found in over 20,000 retail stores and include more than 90 hair treatments and vitamins. She has featured in Entrepreneur magazine and on other outlets as a self-made entrepreneur to watch. The Mane Choice was acquired by MAV Beauty Brands in 2019.

Philanthropy 
She launched Pay My Bill, in which she pays off a bill for one of her Instagram followers each month. She has paid off more than 150 bills to date. She also helped during Hurricane Harvey in Texas by putting people up in hotels. In August 2018, she received press from many outlets for presenting her daughter’s teacher with a new car.

Awards 
Adeleye's awards include the 2017 Stevie Silver Winner for Women in Business, 2017 CurlBOX Award and the Fall 2017 Beauty O-Ward by O Magazine.

References 

Year of birth missing (living people)
Living people
American women chief executives
American women company founders
American company founders
Businesspeople from Detroit
University of Michigan alumni
21st-century American women